The Sulawesi ground dove (Gallicolumba tristigmata) also known as yellow-breasted ground dove is a medium-sized, approximately 35 cm long, olive-brown ground dove with golden forehead, yellow breast, red legs, iridescent bluish-green crown ended with purple patch behind ear coverts, dark brown tail and white below. Both sexes are similar.

An Indonesian endemic, this elusive species is distributed to primary rainforests of Sulawesi in Wallacea. The Sulawesi ground dove is a terrestrial bird. Its diet consists mainly of seeds and fallen fruits taken from feeding grounds. The female lays a single white egg.

The Sulawesi ground dove is evaluated as least concern on the IUCN Red List of Threatened Species.

References

External links 
 BirdLife Species Factsheet

Gallicolumba
Endemic birds of Sulawesi
Birds described in 1855
Taxa named by Charles Lucien Bonaparte